The English women's cricket team toured India in November and December 1995. They played India in 5 One Day Internationals and 3 Test matches. India won the ODI series 3–2, whilst England won the Test series 1–0. England's Test win, by 2 runs, is the narrowest winning margin by runs in Women's Test history. In the same Test, Neetu David took the best bowling figures in an innings in Women's Test history, with 8/53.

Squads

Tour Matches

45-over match: Indian XI v England

45-over match: Women's Cricket Association of India President's XI v England

45-over match: Air India v England

WODI Series

1st ODI

2nd ODI

3rd ODI

4th ODI

5th ODI

Test Series

1st Test

2nd Test

3rd Test

References

External links
England Women tour of India 1995/96 from Cricinfo

India
Women's international cricket tours of India
1995 in women's cricket